During the 1996–97 English football season, Preston North End F.C. competed in the Football League Second Division.

Season summary
In the 1996–97 season, Preston manager Peters kept faith with the majority of his promotion winning outfit from last season, reinforcing his squad at various stages of the season with players who would be crucial to the club's success in subsequent campaigns. Mark Rankine joined from Wolves, Sean Gregan from Darlington for £350,000 and Michael Jackson from Bury. Slowly the team that had got Preston promoted were moved on, as the club looked to build for the future.

Final league table

Results
Preston North End's score comes first

Legend

Football League Second Division

FA Cup

League Cup

Football League Trophy

Squad

References

Preston North End F.C. seasons
Preston North End